Sjodalen is a wide, gently sloping valley in Southern Norway, draining the eastern parts of Jotunheimen. The river Sjoa gives its name to the valley. Sjodalen is generally accepted to start at the outlet from the deep mountain-lake Gjende. The valley's lower end-point is, however less defined as the valley is named Heidal east of Randsverk. Perhaps the most easy definition is to state that the valley draining Sjoa is named Sjodalen in Vågå and Heidal in Sel municipalities.

History

The valley was traditionally used for summer farming. What is particular for the valley is the size and state of these summer farms (sæter in Norwegian). This is partly caused by the very rare tradition of winter-farming in this region. Rather than bringing the summer harvest down into the village and main farm, the farmers took the animals back up into the mountains during winter. This could be done due to the limited snow-fall in this continental climate regime. 

The perhaps best-known tourist site in Sjodalen itself is Ridderspranget. This canyon's name means Knight's Leap and originated with the legend of Sigvat Kvie from Valdres, one of the King Haakon Magnusson's knights (riddar). Sigvat jumped across the river  Sjoa at this narrow point in the canyon, with a beautiful girl from Vågå. He had freed her from Ivar Gjesling successfully taking his love to Valdres.

Geography
In the valley-floor and low valley sides the landscape is dominated by pine, the highest pine-forest of Norway. Above the pine-forest and 150 m wide birch-zone before the alpine bush-vegetations leads into the higher mountains. The western side of Sjodalen is defined by the Jotun nappe, the escarpment that define the Jotunheimen National Park and these mountains reach above 2000 m above sea level.

The river Sjoa feeds two lakes on its progress down the valley: Øvre Sjodalsvatnet and Nedre Sjodalsvatnet. The Sjoa river is a popular place for fishing, rafting, and kayaking. Sjoa river is protected, as is the landscape surrounding the river. Restrictions are therefore set on camping near the river. Several traditional places to spend the night exists, including Randsverk camping, Hindsæter, Bessheim, Maurvangen and Gjendesheim.

References

External links
Ridderspranget (The Knight's Leap)

Valleys of Innlandet